Jerome Johnson (born January 19, 1985) is a former American football fullback. He was signed by the St. Louis Rams as an undrafted free agent in 2009. He played college football at Oregon.

Johnson was also a member of the New York Giants and Arizona Cardinals.

Early years
Johnson was a graduate of Dorsey High School in Los Angeles, California, and was a two-time All-City selection. 2001 City Champion.

College career
Johnson played for one year at West Los Angeles Community College. In 2006, he played in 12 games with no starts on defense as a linebacker and on special teams, recording one tackle at the University of Nevada. In 2007, he played in all 13 games with eight starts at inside linebacker and was fifth on the team with 58 tackles, 6 pass breakups 6.5 tackles for loss  and recovered two fumbles and forced one. He received the BLACK OUT award for hardest hitter. In 2008 Johnson played 13 games at linebacker and made 86 tackles (10 for losses) 8 PBU's and one interception for 28 yards, which he returned for a touchdown. He received the BLACK OUT award and Fireman Award for playing all 3 linebacker positions in a season.

Professional career

St. Louis Rams
Johnson was signed by the St. Louis Rams as an undrafted free agent on April 30, 2009. During the 2009 preseason he had three receptions for 22 yards and one rush for two yards in four games played. He was released on September 5, 2009.

New York Giants
Johnson was signed by the New York Giants on January 6, 2010. He was waived by the Giants on September 4, 2010.

Arizona Cardinals
On September 5, 2010, Johnson was claimed off waivers by the Arizona Cardinals. He was released on September 14, 2010.

Personal
Johnson's brother Jeremiah played at Oregon and signed as an undrafted rookie free agent with the Houston Texans in 2009.

References

External links
Nevada Wolf Pack football bio

1985 births
Living people
Players of American football from Los Angeles
American football fullbacks
American football linebackers
Nevada Wolf Pack football players
St. Louis Rams players
New York Giants players
Susan Miller Dorsey High School alumni